Alteribacillus alkaliphilus is a Gram-positive, aerobic spore-forming, rod-shaped and non-motile bacterium from the genus of Alteribacillus which has been isolated from water from alkaline soil.

References

External links	
Type strain of Alteribacillus alkaliphilus at BacDive -  the Bacterial Diversity Metadatabase

Bacillaceae
Bacteria described in 2016